Fromia ghardaqana, common name Ghardaqa sea star, is a species of marine starfish in the family Goniasteridae.

Distribution
It has been found between 33.7 and 40.1 longitude and 15.3 to 28.6 latitude.

Habitat
It lives in  water.

References

External links
 

ghardaqana
Animals described in 1938